The Pulmonary Vascular Research Institute (PVRI) is a UK registered medical research charity. It is registered Charity in the United Kingdom (Charity No: 1127115) and a private limited company by guarantee. The company registration number in the United Kingdom is 5780068. The PVRI is a professional membership organisation for doctors and scientists from around the world who have a special interest in pulmonary hypertension (PH) or pulmonary vascular diseases (PVD).

History 

The PVRI was founded in 2006 and registered as a charity in the UK in 2007. It began as a virtual, networking platform for clinicians and scientists, which operated from a small office at the University of Kent in Canterbury.  Its network has expanded to over 7,500 people spread across 85 different countries worldwide, including an active membership of 1,250 PH professionals.

Organisation 

PVRI is governed by a group of trustees who, with other invited specialty leaders, form the Council of the PVRI. The Chair of the council is the PVRI President, currently Professor Paul Hassoun, who has a tenure of 2 years. An executive committee meets in the UK to coordinate operational activities and reports in to the council.

The PVRI has established a number of 'Task Forces', which are specialist groups set up to focus on raising awareness in specific regions of the world or research collaborations focusing on medical areas.

Pulmonary vascular disease 
It is generally understood that having high blood pressure can cause problems and reduce life expectancy. High blood pressure usually refers to the pressure in all the organs of the body, except for the lungs. It is very rare to find high blood pressure only in the lungs, but when it occurs, it is often deadly. This condition is called pulmonary hypertension, which leads to pulmonary vascular disease (PVD), the progressive obstruction of the lung blood vessels. This disease is incurable and often fatal. It often has a quiet and insidious onset and therefore the diagnosis is delayed, usually for about two years, by which time the patient is severely compromised. The sufferer gradually becomes short of breath and very tired, finds everyday activities exhausting and can no longer work or carry out everyday tasks. PVD affects all ages and social demographics across the globe. The heart has to work very hard to pump blood through the narrowed arteries in the lungs and eventually the patient develops severe heart failure. PVD can occur as a primary disorder, but there are also various factors which can contribute to PVD, such as living in high altitude, obesity, prolonged and strenuous exercise, congenital heart disease and various other causes.

It is estimated that over 60 million people in the world suffer from PVD, although this figure could be much higher as the disease is often undiagnosed or misdiagnosed.

Events and activities 

The PVRI organises two scientific meetings each year - the Annual World Congress on PVD (held in January) and the Drug Discovery and the Development Symposium for Pulmonary Hypertension (normally in July). These bring together scientists and researchers in the field of pulmonary vascular diseases, the pharmaceutical industry, and relevant regulatory authorities to identify which treatments should be progressed for future development. The 2020 Annual World Congress will be held in Peru from 30 January 2020 to 2 February 2020.

In addition to the two international scientific meetings, the PVRI Regional Task Forces organise local national meetings to raise awareness of PVD.

Members of the PVRI have, via the website, access to an online library of clinical management guidelines, educational materials, advice  and information about current research initiatives and clinical trials. An e-learning course, aimed at doctors, is currently being developed.

Publications 

The PVRI's official scientific journal, Pulmonary Circulation, is an international, peer-reviewed medical research journal focused on publishing original research, review articles, case reports, guidelines and consensus articles exclusively in the fields of the pulmonary circulation and pulmonary vascular disease. It is published on behalf of the PVRI by SAGE Publications.

In 2011, several PVRI members  collaborated to produce the Textbook of Pulmonary Vascular Disease.

Funding 

The PVRI raises funds through membership contributions and fees to scientific events. In addition, the PVRI receives grants from industry bodies and educational funds for its various initiatives.

References

External links 

 Official PVRI website
 Charity Commission

2006 establishments in the United Kingdom